Birnie Duthie (13 June 1905 – 13 April 1994) was a British alpine skier. She competed in the women's combined event at the 1936 Winter Olympics.

References

1905 births
1994 deaths
British female alpine skiers
Olympic alpine skiers of Great Britain
Alpine skiers at the 1936 Winter Olympics
Place of birth missing